

The Bowlus CG-7 was a prototype Second World War American transport glider to be built for United States Army, one was built but the type did not enter production and the programme was cancelled.

Design and development
The Army awarded a contract to Bowlus Sailplanes for an eight-seat and 15-seat transport glider, the smaller glider was designated the XCG-7 and the larger the XCG-8.  The XCG-7 was delivered to Wright Field for testing in February 1942 where it failed structural testing, the glider was repaired but failed again. The glider was not ordered into production and the wood and fabric glider was used to test ways of protecting aircraft against lightning at the High Voltage Labaoratory of the National Bureau of Standards.

Variants
XCG-7
Prototype eight-seat transport glider, one built.

Specifications (XCG-7)

See also

References

Note

Bibliography
 

1940s United States military transport aircraft
Glider aircraft